The Governor of Vologda Oblast is the head of government of Vologda Oblast, a federal subject of Russia.

The position was introduced in 1991 as Head of Administration of Vologda Oblast. The Governor is elected by direct popular vote for a term of five years.

List of officeholders

References 

Politics of Vologda Oblast
 
Vologda